Govinda Fenchu, better known by his regnal title Gour Gobind and also known by the sobriquet Shomudro Tonoy, was the 21st and final king of medieval Sylhet's Gour Kingdom. He is described as a very conservative Hindu ruler whose reign started in 1260.

Govinda was known to be disrespectful and intolerant of other faiths practised in Srihatta, such as Islam, Buddhism and certain Hindu denominations, often getting into war with neighbouring states such as Laur, Jaintia and the Khasis. Thus, he is considered to be the most tyrannical leader in Sylheti history. However, he is also noted as one of the strongest rulers of medieval Sylhet, and during his reign, Gour was described to be "free of enemies" due to other states fearing Govinda. After the arrival of Shah Jalal and the Conquest of Sylhet in 1303, Govinda left Gour and the area came under the rule of Wazir Sikandar Khan Ghazi.

Background and early life

It is said that Govinda Fenchu had an extraordinary birth. His father was Srinanda, the eldest son of Raja Jayananda who was the king of Brahmachal, or Southern Sylhet. Srinanda suffered from chronic rheumatism and so his younger brother, Upananda, took advantage of this by succeeding his father in the throne with the acceptance of the royal officers. Srinanda protested against this but was unsuccessful. He migrated to Kamrup where he became a sannyasi of Kamakhya Temple, leaving behind his wife and son, Govinda. It is said that here, Srinanda gained a better reputation and was even considered by some to be God of the Sea or Pura Raja. Srinanda's wife, Anna Purna was the mother of Govinda Fenchu. Anna was also said to have been a neglected wife of Raja Gai Gobind of the Jaintia Kingdom.

A conflict rose between Govinda's uncle, Raja Upananda of Brahmachal, and Govinda's other uncle, Raja Govardhan of Gour, or Northern Sylhet. Govardhan's allies, the Kukis, raided Upananda's palace in the dead of the night and massacred its inmates. However, Govinda's mother, Anna Purna, was awake and babysitting thirteen royal children, including Govinda, and they all managed to escape to the jungles. They then came across Giridhari, a Bihari sannyasi, who took the children to Kamakhya Temple where they were trained into hermitage.

During his time in Kamrup, Govinda was educated in Kamakhya and given military training in the Kulsia ashram on the banks of the Kulsi River (in modern-day Sualkuchi or Kulsi Reserve Forest) for the next twelve years of his life. He learnt a number of skills which he would use during his reign against his enemies such as archery and magic. He studied alongside Hiravati and Achak Narayan, the orphaned children of a dead Jalpaiguri chief and his captive wife, brought to Kamrup by their nurse Mandavi and her son Jhantu. In 1250, Govardhan would successfully defeat Upananda, thus gaining control of Northern and Southern Sylhet.

Reign

After successfully completing his education, Govinda and his twelve associates were guided by Giridhari back to Sylhet, through Puni beel, in 1260. During this time, Raja Govardhan, the king of Gour, was killed by rebels. Govinda and his accompanying sannyasis went to the temple of Hattanath (tutelary deity of Gour) before launching a surprise attack on the rebels causing them to retreat. Govardhan's wife, Apurna, then thanked the sannyasis and consented for them to rule over Gour as her son, Garuda, who was meant to be Govardhan's heir, was still a minor. Giridhari then informed the royal officers of Govinda's royal lineage, gaining their acceptance, to make his way to the throne. He then changed his name from Govinda Fenchu to Gour Govinda, after his kingdom which he had earned. Govinda appointed Mona Rai as his chief minister, replacing Govardhan's former chief minister Madan Rai.

Govinda then married his childhood friend, Hiravati. In one occasion, Hiravati suffered from an illness and no one in Srihatta could help in curing her. Govinda then travelled to Rarh where he met up with a healer by the name of Chakrapani Dutta. The two men then went back to Gour and Dutta was able to cure Hiravati. Govinda, in delight, requested Dutta to live and spend the rest of his life in the Gour Kingdom. However Dutta wanted to return to Rarh. Not wanting to displease Govinda, Dutta gave his youngest son, Mahipati, to live in the kingdom. Dutta stayed for a while in Gour as Govinda's commander-in-chief. The descendants of Mahipati are now known as the Duttas of Lakhai.

Govinda also made peace with King Ratan Manikya of Tripura, by gifting an elephant. He did this as a plea for the King to return Brahmachal (Southern Sylhet) back to him from the feudal governor Jaidev Rai, to which the King accepted. After the marriage of Achak Narayan to the eight-year-old princess Lalasa, Govinda gifted Narayan by appointing him as the feudal ruler of Tungachal (modern-day Habiganj District). He built forts all over his kingdom and established many military training camps with Takerghat as his naval headquarters. Govinda's army was noted as Bengal's first army which practised the skillful art of archery. He is famously known to have built a seven-storey brick tower in Penchagor which acted as his palace. The ground floor was given to his army, the first to the commander-in-chief Chakrapani Dutta, the second to Mona Rai, the third to the cabinet, and the rest for himself. The palace which was used by the past chief ministers of Gour was given by Govinda to Mona Rai. The new palace in Penchagor, named Gorduar, also remains as ruins today in Mazumdari Mahalla, Ambarkhana Bazar. It was known to his people that he practised magic which he had learnt in the mountains of Kamrup which was in close proximity to his temple.

His military strategy and past victories led to him being very arrogant and boastful of his power. It is said that he would fight lions with swords. There were occasions in which he would go into war with the neighbouring petty kingdoms of Srihatta such as Laur and Jaintia. During a war with the Khasis, Govinda tied the Khasi Raja to ropes, bringing him to Gour. Govinda demanded a ransom for the release of the Khasi king which was later paid. Using Puni beel as a battlefield, Govinda was said to have "drowned his challengers". The Gour Kingdom during his reign became so powerful to such an extent that it was described to be "free of enemies". Govinda would carry on the tradition of using stones (shila) to guard the capital; from which the name of Shilhot came into existence.

Govinda's kingdom bordered Bengal to the west which was ruled by the Muslim Balban dynasty. The Muslim rule led to large numbers of Bengali Hindus to migrate to Gour, which was considered a Hindu stronghold. Govinda encouraged celebrations such as Vishnu-Sankranti, Shiva-Chaturdashi-Mahashtami, Janmashtami and Utthana-Ekadashi, in addition to holding a 45-day celebration in spring. Brahmins from the Deccan (possibly Deshastha Brahmins), also migrated to Gour and gained some authority, being favoured by Govinda for their orthodoxism. These elitist Brahmins led a movement against members of other religions in Gour. They favoured the Brahmins of Brahmachal brought over by Brahmajit. The followers of Tantric Buddhism were treated as dalits, or untouchables of the lowest social status. The Brahmins which King Kesava Deva had welcomed from Central India, were looked down upon by the Deccan Brahmins as low-class as well, in addition to the Namasudras, Kaibartas and Dasas who were influenced too much by Tantric Buddhism.

Defeat 

There was also a minority of Muslim families who migrated to Gour and Tungachal, following the short-lived Azmardan Expedition in 1254 led by the Governor of Bengal, Malik Ikhtiyaruddin Iuzbak. Burhanuddin, who lived in the village of Tultikar, sacrificed a cow for his newborn son's aqiqah or celebration of birth. Govinda, in a fury for what he saw as sacrilege due to his Hindu beliefs, had the newborn, Gulzar Alam, killed, as well as having Burhanuddin's right hand cut off. Shortly after this incident, Qazi Nuruddin of Taraf, a rich cultivator, celebrated his son's marriage ceremony of his son by slaughtering a cow for them to eat. After Nuruddin was expelled from the kingdom, Burhanuddin and Nuruddin's brother, Halimuddin, travelled to lower Bengal where they addressed their issued with Sultan Shamsuddin Firoz Shah of Lakhnauti. This initiated the Muslim Conquest of Gour, consisting of two unsuccessful expeditions led by Syed Nasiruddin and Sikandar Khan Ghazi respectively. Govinda's massive war boats looked as if they were floating forts on the water according to Gulzar-i-Abrar, a Muslim account of the war.  Govinda's family rejoiced and his aunt Apurna, the queen-mother and wife of the deceased Raja Govardhan, celebrated building a large 20-acre water tank in Bara Bazar, Ambarkhana which was known as Rajar Mar Dighi.

Govinda's defeat was in the third battle by the joint force of Sultan's commander-in-chief Sikandar Khan Ghazi's army as well as Shah Jalal and his companions. After hearing that his commander Mona Rai was killed, he escaped with his family to Harong Hurong cave in Mulnicherra. He then went to the shrine of Grivakali, where he left his aunt, Apurna, and his cousin Garuda and cousin-in-law Shanti in the care of the priest. Following this, he took his wife, Hiravati, and son, Nirvana, with him to Kamrup.

Garuda and his family, taking shelter at Grivakali shrine, then decided to head off to Tungachal. However, they were seen by Subid, a rebel of Govardhan, who informed the Muslims leading to Garuda's boat being followed by the Muslims. Out of embarrassment, Garuda committed suicide, jumping off the boat at Puni beel. The boatmen, however, continued taking Garuda's mother and wife to Tungachal, eventually finding refuge with Raja Achak Narayan. They made a vow in Tunganath Shiva temple to fast for ninety days, hoping for safety. Tungachal was eventually conquered subsequently to Gour in the Conquest of Taraf.

|-

See also
 Sylhetis
 List of people from Sylhet

References

External links
 Gour Gobinda on Bangladesh Information
 Gour Gobinda Fort on Offroad Bangladesh

Rulers of Sylhet
14th-century Indian monarchs
People from Sylhet Division